Martin Potter may refer to:

 Martin Potter (actor) (born 1944), British actor
 Martin Potter (surfer) (born 1965), British/South African surfer